Ebba Johanna Birgitta Hultkvist (born 26 September 1983) is a Swedish actress. She played Wilma, the teenage daughter, in the TV series Skärgårdsdoktorn. Since then, she has starred in a few movies and the second season of the celebrity dance show Let's Dance. Ebba was voted off Let's Dance on 9 March 2007.

References

External links

Swedish actresses
1983 births
Living people